Snezhana I. Abarzhi (also known as Snejana I. Abarji) is an applied mathematician and mathematical physicist from the former Soviet Union specializing in the dynamics of fluids and plasmas and their applications in nature and technology.  Her research has indicated that supernovas explode more slowly and less turbulently than previously thought, changing the understanding of the mechanisms by which heavy atomic nuclei are formed in these explosions. She is Professor and Chair of Applied Mathematics at the University of Western Australia.

Education and career
Abarzhi earned bachelor's degrees in physics and applied mathematics and in molecular biology in 1987 from the Moscow Institute of Physics and Technology, and earned a master's degree in physics and applied mathematics there, summa cum laude, in 1990. She completed her doctorate in 1994 through the Landau Institute for Theoretical Physics and Kapitza Institute for Physical Problems of the Russian Academy of Sciences, supervised by Sergei I. Anisimov.

Although she held a position as a researcher for the Russian Academy of Sciences from 1994 to 2004, she came to the US in 1997 as a visiting professor at the University of North Carolina at Chapel Hill, and then in 1998 became an Alexander von Humboldt Fellow at the University of Bayreuth in Germany. In 1999 she took a research position at Stony Brook University. In 2002 she briefly moved to a research professorship at Osaka University before returning to the US as a senior fellow in the Center for Turbulence Research at Stanford University. In 2005 she became a research faculty member at the University of Chicago and in 2006 she added a regular-rank faculty position as an associate professor at the Illinois Institute of Technology. She also worked at Carnegie Mellon University from 2013 to 2016 before moving to the University of Western Australia.

Recognition
In 2020 Abarzhi was named a Fellow of the American Physical Society (APS), after a nomination from the APS Division of Fluid Dynamics, "for deep and abiding work on the Rayleigh-Taylor and related instabilities, and for sustained leadership in that community".

Selected publications

References

Year of birth missing (living people)
Living people
20th-century American mathematicians
21st-century American mathematicians
American women mathematicians
Russian mathematicians
Fluid dynamicists
Moscow Institute of Physics and Technology alumni
Illinois Institute of Technology faculty
Carnegie Mellon University faculty
Academic staff of the University of Western Australia
Fellows of the American Physical Society